The Juventude Atlética de Rio Meão is a Portuguese football (soccer) club in the parish of Rio Meão, municipality of Santa Maria da Feira, the district of Aveiro. The club was founded in 1976.  Its current president is Carlos Ferreira.

League
Aveiro First District Division (2005–2006)

Stadium
Campo Padre Joaquim Sousa Lamas (2.000 people)

Football clubs in Portugal
Sport in Santa Maria da Feira
Association football clubs established in 1976
1976 establishments in Portugal

References